Li Lin or Lin Li may refer to:

People surnamed Li
Li Lin (prince) (李璘, died 757), prince of the Tang dynasty
Li Lin (Tang chancellor) (李麟, 694–759), chancellor of the Tang dynasty
Li Lin (physicist) (李林; 1923–2003), Chinese physicist
Li Lin (biochemist) (李林; born 1961), Chinese biochemist
Lin Li (engineer) (李林), Chinese-British laser engineer

People surnamed Lin
Lin Li (swimmer) (林莉, born 1970), Chinese swimmer
Carrie Lam (actress) or Lin Li (林莉, born 1980), Hong Kong actress
Lin Li (gymnast) (林丽, born 1986), Chinese gymnast
Lin Li (volleyball) (林莉, born 1992), Chinese volleyball player

See also
Lilin (disambiguation)
Linli (disambiguation)